Adonis annua (syn. Adonis autumnalis L., Adonis phoenicea Bercht. & J.Presl.), also known as pheasant's-eye, Adonis' flower, autumn Adonis, autumn pheasant's-eye, blooddrops,  red chamomile, red Morocco, rose-a-ruby, soldiers-in-green, is an ornamental plant of the family Ranunculaceae.

It is native to North Africa, Western Asia, the Mediterranean, and Europe. The name Bird's Eye is also associated with the bird's-eye primrose. Pheasant's eye is also an alternative name for poet's narcissus.

The flowers are often scarlet in color with darker spots at the base.

In the UK, Adonis annua is endangered and listed as a priority species under the UK Biodiversity Action Plan.

The leaves and roots are poisonous to humans and livestock.

Footnotes

References

External links

Adonis annua in Topwalks

annua
Flora of North Africa
Flora of Western Asia
Flora of Palestine (region)
Medicinal plants of Europe
Medicinal plants of Asia
Medicinal plants of Africa
Garden plants of Asia
Garden plants of Africa
Garden plants of Europe
Plants described in 1753
Taxa named by Carl Linnaeus